Mercerville is an unincorporated community and census-designated place (CDP) located within Hamilton Township, in Mercer County, New Jersey, United States. As of the 2010 United States Census, the CDP's population was 13,230. Until after the 2000 Census, the area was part of the Mercerville-Hamilton Square CDP. For the 2010 Census it was split into two CDPs, Mercerville and Hamilton Square.

History

Many historical markers in Mercerville detail the path of the Continental Army under the command of George Washington through the area during the American Revolutionary War. Several are related to their night march from the Second Battle of Trenton to the Battle of Princeton.

Originally called "Sandtown," Mercerville is named after General Hugh Mercer, who died on January 12, 1777, due to wounds incurred at the Battle of Princeton. Hamilton Square was renamed after Alexander Hamilton, during a wave of anti-British sentiment at the time of the War of 1812. It previously had been called Nottingham after the British town.

Historic places
 Isaac Watson House was built in 1708 on a bluff overlooking Watson's Creek; the property totaled . Located at 151 Westcott Avenue, it is the oldest house in Mercer County. The house serves as the Headquarters of the New Jersey State Society DAR. The house is on the National Register of Historic Places (NRHP).
 John Abbott II House was built in 1730 by John Abbott. It is located at 2200 Kuser Rd. on the North side of Crosswicks Creek in nearby Veterans Park. The house is noted as having been used as a secret repository for funds hidden from British as they advanced on Trenton in 1776. The funds were stored by John Abbott II for state treasurer Samuel Tucker inside a tub containing broken crockery.  In 1969 the house was to be razed to the ground but was saved by the Hamilton Township Historical Society. The house is listed on the National Register.
 Isaac Pearson House was built in 1733. Isaac Pearson was elected several times to the state assembly, served on the General Committee of Correspondence appointed by the Provincial Assembly on July 21, 1774, and the first Committee of Safety in October 1775. Pearson was killed by robbers, or was suspected as having collaborated with the British and killed by Continentals. This house is listed on the New Jersey Register of Historic Places.

Geography
According to the United States Census Bureau, the CDP had a total area of 3.730 square miles (9.659 km2), including 3.687 square miles (9.549 km2) of land and 0.043 square miles (0.111 km2) of water (1.14%).

The main intersection in Mercerville is known as Five Points. It the junction of (starting north and heading clockwise): Quaker Bridge Road (County Route 533), Edinburg Road (CR 535), Nottingham Way (CR 618), White Horse-Mercerville Road (CR 533), and Nottingham Way (CR 535). In addition, New Jersey Route 33 runs east and west to the south of this intersection. Except for Notthingham Way east of Five Points, the preceding roads contain most of Mercervile's commercial businesses.

Demographics

Education
Most high school students in Mercerville attend Nottingham High School.

References

Census-designated places in Mercer County, New Jersey
Hamilton Township, Mercer County, New Jersey